Church of the Messiah, or variants thereof, may refer to:
(sorted by state, then city/town)

 Church of the Messiah, Birmingham, United Kingdom
 Church of the Messiah (Louisville, Kentucky), listed on the National Register of Historic Places (NRHP) in Jefferson County
 Episcopal Parish of the Messiah (Auburndale, Massachusetts)
 Church of the Messiah (St. Louis, Missouri), listed on the NRHP
 Church of the Messiah (Glens Falls, New York), an Episcopal church designed by John W. Summers, built between 1854 and 1865
 Church of the Messiah (New York City), New York, a demolished Unitarian church
 Church of the Messiah (Philadelphia, Pennsylvania), a demolished Episcopal church
 Church of the Messiah (Pulaski, Tennessee), listed on the NRHP in Giles County
 Church of the Messiah (Toronto)
  Church of the Messiah (Osun, Ile-Ife), Nigeria
 Church of the Messiah, a Latter Day Saint sect organized by George J. Adams (1811–1880)
 Sanuel J. May was pastor of the Unitarian Church of the Messiah of Syracuse, New York from 1845 until 1868